Hosackia yollabolliensis is a species of flowering plant in the family Fabaceae, native to California. It was first described, as Lotus yollabolliensis, by Philip A. Munz in 1955. It was transferred to Hosackia by D.D. Sokoloff in 2000. It is also known as the Yolla Bolly Mountains bird's-foot trefoil.

References

yollabolliensis
Flora of California
Flora without expected TNC conservation status